B4 is an early morning music video programme on Channel 4, formerly shown weekday mornings at 7:00am. It was normally broadcast as part of Channel 4's breakfast programming following children's programmes and preceding a number of comedy programmes from America. Produced by the firm behind ITV's The Chart Show, and spin off from their B4 music channel on cable and satellite, the show featured around 7 new upfront videos each day that were to be released in the United Kingdom in the near future, normally within the next month.
It was hosted by broadcaster Caroline Feraday - who was out of vision and provided voiceover links.

Trivia
 The first video shown on Channel 4 was Hilary Duff and Haylie Duff covering the Fun Boy Three/The Go-Go's song "Our Lips Are Sealed".

External links 
Music at Channel4.com

Channel 4 original programming
CSC Media Group
2004 British television series debuts
2008 British television series endings
2000s British music television series
English-language television shows